The 2011 Rogers Cup women's singles was a tennis tournament played on outdoor hard courts in Canada.

World No. 1 Caroline Wozniacki was the defending champion, but lost to Roberta Vinci in the second round.

Serena Williams won her second Rogers Cup title, by beating Samantha Stosur 6–4, 6–2 in the final.

Seeds
The top eight seeds receive a bye into the second round.

Qualifying

Main draw

Finals

Top half

Section 1

Section 2

Bottom half

Section 3

Section 4

References

External links
Main draw and Qualifying draw

2011 WTA Tour
Women's Singles
2011 in Canadian women's sports